Hypnosis Mic: Division Rap Battle is a Japanese multimedia franchise featuring fictional rappers.

Tokyo

Buster Bros!!!
Buster Bros!!! is a rap team from Ikebukuro consisting of the Yamada brothers. Their leader is Ichiro Yamada, and their team songs are "Ikebukuro West Game Park", and "Re:start!!!."And "IKEBUKURO WEST BLOCK PARTY" Their official color is red.

Stage Actor: Akira Takano
Ichiro uses the name MC.B.B (pronounced "MC Big Brother"). He is 19 years old and the oldest of the Yamada brothers. While he's the leader of Buster Bros!!!, he used to be a member of The Dirty Dawg.

Stage Actor: Shōta Matsuda
Jiro uses the name MC.M.B (pronounced "MC Middle Brother"). He is 17 years old.

Stage Actor: Ryuto Akishima
Saburo uses the name MC.L.B (pronounced "MC Little Brother"). He is 14 years old and the youngest of the Yamada brothers, but is remarkably intelligent.

Mad Trigger Crew
Mad Trigger Crew is a rap team from Yokohama consisting of crime and military personnel. Their leader is Samatoki Aohitsugi, and their team songs are "Yokohama Walker", "Shinogi (Dead Pools)", and "Hunting Charm.","Scarface" Their official color is blue.

Stage Actor: Aran Abe
Samatoki uses the name Mr. HC (pronounced "Mr. Hardcore"). He is the leader of Mad Trigger Crew and used to be a member of The Dirty Dawg. He has a younger sister named Nemu. His solo songs are "G Anthem of Y-City" and "Gangsta's Paradise."

Stage Actor: Kenta Mizue
Jyuto uses the name 45 Rabbit. He is 29 years old and a corrupt police officer.

Stage Actor: Yūki Byrnes
Rio uses the name Crazy M. He is 28 years old and half-American from his father's side. He is a former military officer. His solo songs are "What's My Name?" and "2Die4."

Fling Posse
Fling Posse is a rap team from Shibuya, consisting of people from the art and entertainment industry. Their leader is Ramuda Amemura, and their team songs are "Shibuya Marble Texture (PCCS)", "Stella", and "Black Journey.","とりま Get on the floor" Their official color is yellow.

Stage Actor: Ryo Sekoguchi
Ramuda uses the name Easy R. He is 24 years old. He is the leader of Fling Posse and used to be a member of The Dirty Dawg. He is a fashion designer.

Stage Actor: Takahisa Maeyama
Gentaro uses the name Phantom. He is 24 years old and an author.

Stage Actor: Ryo Takizawa
Dice uses the name Dead or Alive. He is 20 years old and a gambler. His solo songs are "3 Seven" and "Scramble Gamble."

Matenrō
 is a rap team from Shinjuku consisting of medical and office personnel. Matenro was the winner of the 2018 rap battles.

Stage Actor: Taiyo Ayukawa
Jakurai uses the name ill-DOC. He is 35 years old. He is the leader of Matenro and used to be a member of The Dirty Dawg. He is a doctor.

Stage Actor: Hirofumi Araki
Hifumi uses the name Gigolo. He is 29 years old. He is a host.

Stage Actor: Kodai Miyagi
Doppo uses the name Doppo (in romaji). He is 29 years old. He is an office worker. He has a pessimistic attitude.

Other regions

Dotsuitare Hompo
 is a rap team from Osaka, introduced in September 2019 along with Bad Ass Temple. Their leader is Sasara Nurude.

Stage Actor: Yoshihiko Aramaki
Sasara uses the name Tragic Comedy. He is 26 years old and a stand-up comedian. He used to be in a group with Samatoki, known as "Mad Comic Dialogue." His solo songs is "Tragic Transistor." And "コメディアン・ラプソディ"

Stage Actor: Masamichi Satonaka
Rosho uses the name WISDOM. He is 26 years old and a teacher. His solo songs is "Own Stage." And "Under sail"

Stage Actor: Yoshihisa Higashiyama
Rei uses the name MC MasterMind. He is 46 years old and a conman. His solo songs is "Faces." and "Count the money"

Bad Ass Temple
Bad Ass Temple is a rap team from Nagoya, introduced in September 2019 along with Dotsuitare Hompo. Their leader is Kuko Harai.

Stage Actor: Ryota Hirono 
Kuko uses the name Evil Monk. He is 19 years old and a monk. He used to be in a group with Ichiro, known as "Naughty Busters." His solo songs are and "Young Gun of The Sun"

Stage Actor: Daigo Kato
Jyushi uses the name 14th Moon. He is 18 years old and the vocalist for a visual kei band. His solo songs are "Moonlight Shadow." and "Violet Masquerade"

Stage Actor: Ruito Aoyagi
Hitoya uses the name Heaven and Hell. He is 35 years old and a lawyer. His solo songs are "One and Two, and Law." and "If I Follow My Heart"

References

External links
  

Hypnosis Mic